The New Zealand Customs Service Medal is a long service award for members of the New Zealand Customs Service who have completed 14 years of service. Established in February 2008, the medal was first presented 5 May 2008 by then Prime Minister Helen Clark.

Appearance
The medal is circular and made of silver metal. On the obverse is the crowned effigy of the Sovereign. The reverse bears a representation of the Badge of the New Zealand Customs Service. The medal hangs from a 32 mm wide ribbon of 5 stripes of dark blue at the edges, light blue in the centre, bordered by yellow.

References

Civil awards and decorations of New Zealand
New Zealand Meritorious & Long Service Awards
Long and Meritorious Service Medals of Britain and the Commonwealth